In Greek mythology, Urania (Ancient Greek: Οὐρανία or Οὐρανίη Ouranía means 'heavenly') may refer to the following divinities:

 Urania, the Oceanid with a 'divine in form'. She was one of the 3,000 water-nymph daughters of the Titans Oceanus and his sister-spouse Tethys. Along with her sisters, Urania was one of the companions of Persephone when the daughter of Demeter was abducted by Hades.
 Urania, one of the nine Muses, daughters of Zeus, king of the gods, and the Titaness Mnemosyne.
 Urania, a surname of Aphrodite, describing her as "the heavenly," or spiritual, to distinguish her from Aphrodite Pandemos. Plato represents her as a daughter of Uranus, begotten without a mother. Wine was not used in the libations offered to her. The tortoise, the symbol of domestic modesty and chastity, was sacred to her.

Notes

References 

 Herodotus, The Histories with an English translation by A. D. Godley. Cambridge. Harvard University Press. 1920. . Online version at the Topos Text Project. Greek text available at Perseus Digital Library.
 Hesiod, Theogony from The Homeric Hymns and Homerica with an English Translation by Hugh G. Evelyn-White, Cambridge, MA.,Harvard University Press; London, William Heinemann Ltd. 1914. Online version at the Perseus Digital Library. Greek text available from the same website.
 The Homeric Hymns and Homerica with an English Translation by Hugh G. Evelyn-White. Homeric Hymns. Cambridge, MA.,Harvard University Press; London, William Heinemann Ltd. 1914. Online version at the Perseus Digital Library. Greek text available from the same website.
 Kerényi, Carl, The Gods of the Greeks, Thames and Hudson, London, 1951.
Publius Ovidius Naso, Fasti translated by James G. Frazer. Online version at the Topos Text Project.
 Publius Ovidius Naso, Fasti. Sir James George Frazer. London; Cambridge, MA. William Heinemann Ltd.; Harvard University Press. 1933. Latin text available at the Perseus Digital Library.
 Suida, Suda Encyclopedia translated by Ross Scaife, David Whitehead, William Hutton, Catharine Roth, Jennifer Benedict, Gregory Hays, Malcolm Heath Sean M. Redmond, Nicholas Fincher, Patrick Rourke, Elizabeth Vandiver, Raphael Finkel, Frederick Williams, Carl Widstrand, Robert Dyer, Joseph L. Rife, Oliver Phillips and many others. Online version at the Topos Text Project.

Oceanids
Women in Greek mythology
Epithets of Aphrodite